Two ships of the Royal Navy have been named HMS Africaine:

 HMS Africaine was a 38-gun fifth-rate frigate, previously the French L'Africaine.
  was a 46-gun fifth-rate frigate launched in 1827. She was sold as a hulk to Trinity House in 1867 and was broken up in 1903.

See also
 
 

Royal Navy ship names